Amanda Kessel (born August 28, 1991) is an American professional ice hockey player. She has been a member of the United States women's national ice hockey team and played four seasons for the Minnesota Golden Gophers women's ice hockey program (2010–11 through 2012–13, and 2015–16). She has played professionally in the National Women's Hockey League and Professional Women's Hockey Players Association. Amanda Kessel was also the Captain of the Championship Team at the Pink Whitney Cup.

Playing career
Before high school, she participated in the Madison Capitols Bantam boys team in 2005–06 and helped the team to state and regional championships. Kessel attended Shattuck St. Mary's in Minnesota. The 2007 edition of the team captured the U-19 national championship, while Kessel marked 102 points in 56 games. In her junior year, Kessel registered 44 goals and 56 assists for 100 points (1.29 goals per game and 1.65 assists per game). She accomplished the 100-point mark in 34 games and won her second consecutive U-19 national championship. She tallied 122 points (67 goals (1.46 goals per game) and 55 assists (1.20 assists per game) in just 46 games) in her final season. She was the team leader by 61 points.

NCAA
October 1, 2010: In her first game as a Golden Gopher, Amanda Kessel registered four points (two goals, two assists). The following day, Kessel scored the game-winning goal as the Gophers won by a 3–0 score. The game against Clarkson marked the first time in school history that the Gophers opened a season against a ranked opponent.
On December 10, Amanda Kessel assisted on a career-high four goals in a conference victory over visiting Ohio State. The Gophers enjoyed a 6–0 win.
November 18, 2010: Kessel registered five points (including four goals) as the Golden Gophers defeated the New Hampshire Wildcats by an 11–0 tally. This was the worst loss in the 35-year history of the Wildcats program.
November 19: Kessel earned her second hat trick of the series as the Gophers defeated New Hampshire by a 6–1 tally.
 September 10, 2014, the Golden Gophers announced that Kessel would sit out the 2014–15 season as a result of lingering concussion symptoms she had sustained while playing for Team USA.
 July 21, 2015: the Golden Gophers announced that Kessel would not be playing hockey for the 2015–16 season due to health reasons.  Because she had previously taken a redshirt year on two prior occasions, she will no longer be eligible to play college hockey.
 February 3, 2016: The Golden Gophers announced that Kessel returned to the team. Despite earlier prognoses, she continued working to gain clearance from doctors to play hockey and succeeded late in the 2015–2016 season in time for the February 5–6 series against North Dakota.

Team USA
As a member of the U.S. Women's National Team, Kessel has won a medal at all the international tournaments she has participated in:
Silver medalist at the 2022 Winter Olympics in Beijing, China
Gold medalist at the 2019 IIHF Women's World Championship in Espoo, Finland
Gold medalist at the 2018 Winter Olympics in Pyeongchang, South Korea
Gold medalist at the 2017 IIHF Women's World Championship in Plymouth, Michigan
Silver medalist at the 2014 Olympic Games in Sochi, Russia
Gold medalist at the 2013 IIHF Women's World Championship in Ottawa, Ontario, Canada
Silver medalist at the 2012 IIHF Women's World Championship in Burlington, Vermont
Gold medalist at the 2011 and 2012 Four Nations Cup

Before being named to the U.S. Women's National Team, Kessel was a member of the United States Under-22 Team and Under-18 Team. Kessel played for the United States Under-18 in 2009 and was named the World Under-18 tournament's most valuable forward. She scored six goals and 13 assists for 19 points to lead Team USA to a gold medal. In the 2008 Under 18 World Championships, she played in five games with Team USA and tallied 11 points, ranking third among all players in scoring. Kessel was named to the US team participating in the 2010 Four Nations Cup. She did not play due to an injury.

Professional
Kessel was never drafted by a National Women's Hockey League team; league rules stipulate that a college player must be entering her senior year to be drafted, and Kessel's junior season was completed in 2013 before the league existed. Instead, she signed as a free agent with the New York Riveters on May 1, 2016. Her contract of $26,000 was the largest NWHL contract to date. Kessel was named one of the two captains for the 2nd NWHL All-Star Game. Scoring a hat trick in the All-Star Game, the first to do so in NWHL All-Star history, she would also be recognized as the game's Most Valuable Player. After taking a season off from the NWHL due to national team commitments, she returned to the NWHL with the renamed Metropolitan Riveters for the 2018–19 season.

PWHPA
Following the 2018–19 season, Kessel was one of many players to join the boycott on North American women's hockey leagues and join the new players' union, the Professional Women's Hockey Players Association (PWHPA), to push for better support of women's hockey. She was named a team captain at the January 2020 Toronto showcase.

Skating for Team New Hampshire during the 2020–21 PWHPA season, Kessel participated in a PWHPA Dream Gap Tour event at New York's Madison Square Garden on February 28, 2021, the first women's ice hockey event at the venue. Playing for a team sponsored by the Women's Sports Foundation, Kessel recorded a goal and an assist in a 4–3 win, earning the Second Star of the Game.

Administrative career 
On April 20, 2022, the Pittsburgh Penguins of the National Hockey League (NHL) announced that Kessel would be the first member of their Executive Management Program, a one-year fellowship designed to give women and minority groups administrative expertise in preparation for a job in NHL management.

Career statistics
Career statistics are from USCHO.com, or Eliteprospects.com, or The Internet Hockey Database, or NCAA.

Regular season and playoffs

International

Awards
WCHA Co-Offensive Player of the Week (Week of October 12, 2011)
WCHA Co-Offensive Player of the Week (Week of November 21, 2011)
WCHA Offensive Player of the Week (Week of February 8, 2012)
2013  Patty Kazmaier Award (Collegiate National Player of the Year)
2014 Olympic Silver Medalist
2018 Olympic Gold Medalist

Personal life
Kessel is the sister of Vegas Golden Knights player Phil Kessel and Blake Kessel, a retired professional ice hockey defenseman and current coach for Newark Ironbound 16U Premier in the USA Hockey Women's 16U AAA.

Her father, Phil Kessel Sr., was drafted by the Washington Redskins and stayed on the injured reserve for one year.

In 2019, Kessel paired with Eric Radford for the fifth season of CBC's Battle of the Blades, where hockey players paired with figure skaters to compete for their chosen charity.  However, she and Radford were the first couple eliminated.

References

External links

Amanda Kessel at Minnesota Golden Gophers

1991 births
American women's ice hockey forwards
Ice hockey players from Wisconsin
Ice hockey players at the 2014 Winter Olympics
Ice hockey players at the 2018 Winter Olympics
Ice hockey players at the 2022 Winter Olympics
Living people
Minnesota Golden Gophers women's ice hockey players
Medalists at the 2014 Winter Olympics
Medalists at the 2018 Winter Olympics
Medalists at the 2022 Winter Olympics
Metropolitan Riveters players
New York Riveters players
Olympic gold medalists for the United States in ice hockey
Olympic silver medalists for the United States in ice hockey
Patty Kazmaier Award winners
Sportspeople from Madison, Wisconsin
Big Ten Athlete of the Year winners
Professional Women's Hockey Players Association players